Diaphorina is an Old World genus of sap-sucking hemipteran bugs in the family, Liviidae. It includes an important pest of citrus: the Asian citrus psyllid, D. citri.

Species
The genus contains some 68 to 74 species. The Catalogue of Life lists:
 Diaphorina acokantherae
 Diaphorina aegyptiaca
 Diaphorina albomaculata
 Diaphorina amoena
 Diaphorina bicolor
 Diaphorina bikanerensis
 Diaphorina brevicornis
 Diaphorina brevigena
 Diaphorina carissae
 Diaphorina chobauti
 Diaphorina citri
 Diaphorina clutiae
 Diaphorina communis
 Diaphorina continua
 Diaphorina dakariensis
 Diaphorina dunensis
 Diaphorina elegans
 Diaphorina enderleini
 Diaphorina enormis
 Diaphorina ericae
 Diaphorina euryopsi
 Diaphorina fabulosa
 Diaphorina florea
 Diaphorina fusca
 Diaphorina guttulata
 Diaphorina gymnosporiae
 Diaphorina harteni
 Diaphorina helichrysi
 Diaphorina lamproptera
 Diaphorina leptadeniae
 Diaphorina linnavuorii
 Diaphorina loranthi
 Diaphorina luteola
 Diaphorina lycii
 Diaphorina minor
 Diaphorina multimaculata
 Diaphorina natalensis
 Diaphorina petteyi
 Diaphorina porrigogena
 Diaphorina punctipennis
 Diaphorina punctulata
 Diaphorina pusilla
 Diaphorina putonii
 Diaphorina quadramaculata
 Diaphorina rubra
 Diaphorina similis
 Diaphorina solani
 Diaphorina tenebrosa
 Diaphorina truncata
 Diaphorina tryoni
 Diaphorina typica
 Diaphorina valens
 Diaphorina venata
 Diaphorina virgata
 Diaphorina zebrana

References

External links

Psyllidae
Psylloidea genera